USS Unit was a steamer acquired by the Union Navy during the American Civil War.

She was used as a tugboat by the Navy and she provided her services to ships in the blockade squadrons. She also served as a repair tender for ships needing her services.

Service during the American Civil War 

Unit—steamer Union built at Philadelphia in 1862—was purchased at Boston on 2 June 1864. Unit was assigned to the North Atlantic Blockading Squadron and served as a tug and repair vessel in Hampton Roads, Virginia, for the duration of the Civil War. In June 1865, the tug was sent to New York City.

End-of-war decommission and continued maritime career 

Unit was sold at auction there on 12 July 1865 to C. and E. T. Peters. Redocumented as a merchant steamer on 6 September 1865, Unit remained in mercantile service until 1902.

References  

Ships of the Union Navy
Ships built in Philadelphia
Steamships of the United States Navy
Tugs of the United States Navy
Tenders of the United States Navy
American Civil War auxiliary ships of the United States
1862 ships